Volendam is a fishing town in the municipality of Edam-Volendam, province of North Holland, Netherlands. As of 1 January 2021, it has a population of 22,715. It is twinned with Coventry, England.

History
Originally, Volendam was the location of the harbour of the nearby Edam, which was situated at the mouth of the IJ bay. 

In 1357, the inhabitants of Edam dug a shorter canal to the Zuiderzee with its own separate harbour. This removed the need for the original harbour, which was then dammed and used for land reclamation. Farmers and local fishermen settled there, forming the new community of Vollendam, which translates to 'Full dam'. 

In the early part of the 20th century Volendam became something of an artists' retreat, with both Picasso and Renoir spending time here. 

The majority of the population belongs to the Roman Catholic Church, which is deeply connected to the village culture. Historically, many missionaries and bishops grew up in Volendam. Today there is the chapel of Our Lady of the Water, which is located in a village park.

New Year's café fire

In the New Year's night of 2000 to 2001, the lighting of a bundle of sparklers caused a short but intense fire at a party in café De Hemel. The sparklers ignited the dry Christmas decorations on the ceiling, which fell down in their entirety. 14 people died and 200 people were seriously injured.

Tourism

Volendam is a popular tourist attraction in the Netherlands, well known for its old fishing boats and the traditional clothing still worn by some residents. The women's costume of Volendam, with its high, pointed bonnet, is one of the most recognizable of the Dutch traditional costumes, and is often featured on tourist postcards and posters (although there are believed to be fewer than 50 women now wearing the costume as part of their daily lives, most of them elderly). There is a regular ferry connection to Marken, a peninsula close by. Volendam also features a small museum about its history and clothing style, and visitors can have their pictures taken in traditional Dutch costumes.

Film
Volendam was a shooting location in Vikas Bahl's 2014 Bollywood film, Queen. The actors established an Indian food shop called Rani's Gol Gappa. The owner was an Italian, Marco Canadea, as Marcello. Working with Marco was Mish Boyko as Oleksander (Sikander), Jeffrey Ho as Taka, and Joseph Guitobh as Tim. The role of Queen was played by Indian actress Kangana Ranaut.

Sports
FC Volendam is a football club based in Volendam, which has regularly played in the Dutch Eredivisie. FC Volendam promoted to the Eredivisie in 2022 after a 13 year stint in the Eerste Divisie).

Music
Volendam is also well known for its distinctive music, which is called Palingsound (literally "eel sound") in reference to Volendam's status as a fishing village.
During the 1960s, the local group The Cats was a very popular group in the Netherlands and abroad.

Another band from Volendam was BZN, which became popular in the late 1960s and early 1970s. In 1995 BZN performed a duet with the ten-year-old Jan Smit, who quickly became a celebrity in his own right.

The popular music groups 3JS and Nick & Simon are famously from Volendam, whose members have all participated in local musical performances through the years.

Born in Volendam
 Gerrie Mühren (born 1946), international footballer
 Jan Keizer (born 1949), singer
 Arnold Mühren (born 1951), international footballer
 Pier Tol (born 1958), international footballer
 Carla Braan (born 1961), gymnast
 Carola Smit (born 1963), singer
 Wim Jonk (born 1966), international footballer
 Nick Schilder (born 1983), singer
 Simon Keizer (born1984), singer
 Jan Smit (born 1985), singer
 Cees Keizer (born 1986), footballer
 Janey Jacké (born 1992), Drag Queen

References

External links

Tourist information about Volendam (Dutch)
Tourist information about Volendam (in English)

 
Populated places in North Holland
Geography of Edam-Volendam